Marie-Paul Achille Auguste Le Flem (18 March 1881 – 31 July 1984) was a French composer and music critic.

Biography 
Born in Radon, Orne, and living most of his life in Lézardrieux, Le Flem studied at the Schola Cantorum under Vincent d'Indy and Albert Roussel, later teaching at the same establishment, where his pupils included Erik Satie (as a mature student) and André Jolivet. His music is strongly influenced by his native Brittany, the landscape of which is reflected in most of his work.

Before World War I, Le Flem produced several major works, including his First Symphony, a Fantasy for Piano and Orchestra, and an opera. The war temporarily put an end to his compositional activities, and in its aftermath he devoted himself to music criticism and choral conducting. He wrote numerous articles for the periodical Comoedia.

In 1937, he began composing once again. Three additional symphonies and a second opera followed before he was finally forced to give up composition in 1976, at the age of 95, due to blindness. He died on 31 July 1984 at the age of 103.

Some of his dramatic works include the operas Le Rossignol de St-Malo (The Nightingale of St Malo) and La Magicienne de la mer (The Magician of the Sea), as well as a version of the chante-fable Aucassin et Nicolette. For the Dead and the seven Pièces enfantines, both originally written in 1911, were orchestrated some years later. Two of the composer's children died young, and For the Dead is dedicated to their memory. In addition to his symphonies, Le Flem wrote evocative orchestral music such as En mer (At Sea) and La Voix du large (The Voice of the Open Sea). Le Flem also composed the music for Jean Tedesco's short film The Great Gardener of France in 1942.

Le Flem was a member of the Association des Compositeurs Breton; another member, the Irish-American Swan Hennessy (1866–1929) dedicated his Petit trio celtique, Op. 52 (1921) to Le Flem.

Personal life 
He died in Tréguier in 1984.

Selected compositions

Opera
Aucassin et Nicolette (1909)
La Fête du printemps (1937)
Le Rossignol de Saint-Malo (1938)
La Clairière des fées (1944)
La Magicienne de la mer (1947)
La Maudite (1968)

Orchestral
Symphony No. 1 (1908)
Les Voix du large (1911)
Fantaisie (1911) for piano and orchestra
Le Village (1943)
La Ronde des fées (1943)
Symphony No. 2 (1958)
Concertstück (1964) for violin and orchestra
Symphony No. 3 (1967)
Symphony No. 4 (1974)

Chamber music
Sonata for violin and piano (1905)
Danse désuète for harp and string quartet (1909)
Quintet for piano and string quartet (1910)
Pièce for flute and cello (1925)
Pièce for horn and piano (1952)
Sérénité for Ondes Martenot and piano (1955)
Concertstück (1964) for violin and piano (1964)

Piano music
Éponine et Sabinius (1897)
Par landes (1907)
Par grèves (1907)
Avril (1910)
Le Chant des genêts (1910)
Vieux calvaire (1910)
Sept Pièces enfantines (1911)
Pavane de mademoiselle (Style Louis XIV) (undated)

Selected recordings
Paul Le Flem: Quintette & Sonate, Timpani 1C1077 (2004), performed by Philippe Koch (vn), Alain Jacquon (pf), Quatuor Louvigny. Contains: Quintet for piano and strings; Violin Sonata.
Paul Le Flem: Complete Piano Works, Grand Piano GP 695 (CD, 2016), performed by Giorgio Koukl. Contains: Avril; Vieux calvaire; Par landes; Par grèves; Le Chant des genêts; Sept Pièces enfantines; Les Korrigans – Valse bretonne; Pour la main droite; Mélancolie; Éponine et Sabinius; Pavane de mademoiselle (Style Louis XIV); Émotions.

Bibliography
 Vendramini-Joseph, Cecile: Paul le Flem, musicien breton (Diss. Paris: Univ. Sorbonne, 1980).
 Vefa de Bellaing: Dictionnaire des compositeurs de musique en Bretagne (Nantes: Ouest Editions, 1992), .
 Bernard-Krauss, Geneviève: Hundert Jahre französischer Musikgeschichte in Leben und Werk Paul Le Flems (Frankfurt etc.: Peter Lang, 1993), .
 Gonin, Philippe: Vie et œuvre de Paul Le Flem (Villeneuve-d'Ascq: Presses universitaires du Septentrion, 2001).

References

External links
 Compositeurs Bretons biography page, accessed 29 January 2010

1881 births
1984 deaths
20th-century classical composers
20th-century French composers
20th-century French male musicians
Breton musicians
French centenarians
French male classical composers
French opera composers
Male opera composers
Men centenarians
People from Orne